Hamza is a letter in the Arabic alphabet, representing the glottal stop . Hamza is not one of the 28 "full" letters and owes its existence to historical inconsistencies in the standard writing system. It is derived from the Arabic letter ʿAyn. In the Phoenician and Aramaic alphabets, from which the Arabic alphabet is descended, the glottal stop was expressed by alif, continued by Alif (  ) in the Arabic alphabet. However, Alif was used to express both a glottal stop and also a long vowel . In order to indicate that a glottal stop is used, and not a mere vowel, it was added to Alif diacritically. In modern orthography,  hamza may also appear on the line, under certain circumstances as though it were a full letter, independent of an Alif.

Etymology 
Hamza is derived from the verb  meaning 'to prick, goad, drive' or 'to provide (a letter or word) with hamzah'.

Hamzat al-waṣl ( ٱ ) 

Although the  can be written as an alif carrying a  sign  (only in the Quran), it is normally indicated by a plain alif without a hamza.

 occurs in:

 the definite article 
 some short words with two of their three-consonant roots apparent: ism , ibn , imru  (fem. imra'ah ), ithnāni  (fem. ithnatāni )
 the imperative verbs of forms I and VII to X
 the perfective aspect of verb forms VII to X and their verbal nouns
 some borrowed words that start with consonant clusters such as 

It is not pronounced following a vowel. This event occurs in the definite article or at the beginning of a noun following a preposition or a verb following a relative pronoun. If the definite article al- is followed by a sun letter, -l- also gives way for the next letter for lām is assimilated.

 Orthography 
The hamza can be written either alone, as if it were a letter, or with a carrier, when it becomes a diacritic:

 Alone: (only one isolated form):

 By itself:
High Hamza (not used in Arabic language; only one isolated form, but actually used in medial and final positions where it will be non joining), after any Arabic letter (if that letter has an initial or medial form, these forms will be changed to isolated or final forms respectively):

Three-Quarter High Hamza (used in Malay; only one isolated form, but actually used in medial and final positions where it will be non joining):
This form is in the process of being encoded into the Unicode Standard and is currently being displayed using a standard Arabic Hamza with an altered vertical position.
 Combined with a letter:
 Above or below an :

 Above a :

 Above a dotless , also called 
 . Joined medially and finally in Arabic, other languages written in Arabic-based script may have it initially as well (or it may take its isolated or initial shape, even in Arabic, after a non-joining letter in the same word):

 Above . In the Persian alphabet, not used in Arabic:

 Above . In the Pashto alphabet, not used in Arabic:

 Above . In the Khowar alphabet, not used in Arabic:

 Arabic "seat" rules 

The rules for writing hamza differ somewhat between languages even if the writing is based on the Arabic abjad. The following addresses Arabic specifically.

 Summary 
 Medial hamza will have a seat or be written alone:
 As a special case,  and  require hamza on the line, instead of over an alif as one would expect. (See III.1b below.)
 Final hamza will have a seat or be written alone:
 Alone on the line when preceded by a long vowel or final consonant.
 Has a seat matching the final short vowel for words ending in a short vowel.
 Two adjacent alifs are never allowed. If the rules call for this, replace the combination by a single alif maddah.

 Detailed description 
Logically, hamza is just like any other letter, but it may be written in different ways.  It has no effect on the way other letters are written.  In particular, surrounding long vowels are written just as they always are, regardless of the "seat" of the hamza—even if this results in the appearance of two consecutive wāws or yāʾs.
Hamza can be written in five ways: on its own ("on the line"), under an alif, or over an alif, wāw, or yāʾ, called the "seat" of the hamza. When written over yāʾ, the dots that would normally be written underneath are omitted.
When according to the rules below, a hamza with an alif seat would occur before an alif which represents the vowel ā, a single alif is instead written with the maddah symbol over it.
The rules for hamza depend on whether it occurs as the initial, middle, or final letter (not sound) in a word. (Thus, final short inflectional vowels do not count, but  is written as alif + nunation, counts, and the hamza is considered medial.)

I. If the hamza is initial:

If the letter following the hamza is an alif itself: (as in  ) alif maddah will occur.

II. If the hamza is final:

If a short vowel precedes, the hamza is written over the letter ( or ) corresponding to the short vowel.
Otherwise, the hamza is written on the line (as in   "thing").

III. If the hamza is medial:

If a long vowel or diphthong precedes, the seat of the hamza is determined mostly by what follows:

Otherwise, the hamza would be written on the line. (as in )
Otherwise, both preceding and following vowels have an effect on the hamza.

If there is only one vowel (or two of the same kind), that vowel determines the seat ( or ).
Alif-maddah occurs if appropriate.

Not surprisingly, the complexity of the rules causes some disagreement.
Barron's 201 Arabic Verbs follows the rules exactly (but the sequence  does not occur; see below).
John Mace's Teach Yourself Arabic Verbs and Essential Grammar presents alternative forms in almost all cases when hamza is followed by a long . The motivation appears to be to avoid two s in a row. Generally, the choice is between the form following the rules here or an alternative form using hamza over yāʾ in all cases. Example forms are masʾūl ([adj: responsible, in charge, accountable]; [noun: official, functionary]), yajīʾūna (verb: jāʾa  "to come"), yashāʾūna (verb: shāʾa  "to will, to want, to intend, to wish").  Exceptions:

Perhaps, the resulting sequence of three wāws would be especially repugnant.
In the sequence  (verb: qaraʾa  "to read, to recite, to review/ study") the alternative form has hamza over alif, not .
The forms yabṭuʾūna (verb: baṭuʾa  "to be or become slow, late or backward, "to come late", "to move slowly") and yaʾūbu (verb:  "move to the back", "to return  to come back", "to repent") have no alternative form. (Note  with the same sequence of vowels.)
Haywood and Nahmad's A new Arabic Grammar of the Written Language does not write the paradigms out in full, but in general agrees with John Mace's book, including the alternative forms and sometimes lists a third alternative with the entire sequence  written as a single hamza over  instead of as two letters.
 Al-Kitāb fī Taʿallum... presents paradigms with hamza written the same way throughout, regardless of the rules above. (It appears to be an overgeneralization on the part of the al-Kitāb writers.)

 Overview tables 

The letter  (ṭ) stands here for any consonant.Note''': The table shows only potential combinations and their graphic representations according to the spelling rules; not every possible combination exists in Arabic.Colours:Notes:

 Hamza in other Arabic-script alphabets 

 Jawi alphabet 
In the Jawi alphabet (Arabic script used to write Malay), hamza is used for various purposes, but is rarely used to denote a glottal stop except in certain Arabic loanwords. The default isolated hamza form is the second least common form of hamza, whereas another form unique to the Jawi script, the three-quarter high hamza (Malay: hamzah tiga suku) is most commonly used in daily Jawi writing. The three-quarter high hamza itself is used in many cases:

 Separating vowel letters of a diphthongsuch as ai, au, and oi when present in certain positions within words 
 To write non-Malay single-syllable words (most commonly names) that starts with a vowel other than alif 
 Glottal stops for archaic words (specifically titles and names which have a fixed spelling)
 In some instances Arabic loanwords which change their original spelling may change the hamza to the three-quarter high hamza instead

This form, however, has yet to be added to the Unicode Standard as it is in the process of being proposed to the Unicode Consortium. Currently, the only way of writing this form is by using a normal hamza and altering its vertical position.

This form as well as hamza below alif  are both also in Arabic loanwords where the original spelling has been retained.

The hamza above ya  is known as a "housed hamzah", and is most commonly used in Arabic loanwords.

Hamza above waw  is completely removed from the Jawi alphabet, and for Arabic loanwords using the letter, it is replaced with a normal waw followed by a three-quarter high hamza instead.

 Urdu (Shahmukhi) alphabet 
In the Urdu alphabet, hamza does not occur at the initial position over alif since alif is not used as a glottal stop in Urdu. In the middle position, if hamza is surrounded by vowels, it indicates a diphthong between the two vowels. In the middle position, if hamza is surrounded by only one vowel, it takes the sound of that vowel. In the final position hamza is silent or produces a glottal sound, as in Arabic.

In Urdu, hamza usually represents a diphthong between two vowels. It rarely acts like the Arabic hamza except in a few loanwords from Arabic.

Hamza is also added at the last letter of the first word of ezāfe compound to represent -e- if the first word ends with yeh or with he or over bari yeh if it is added at the end of the first word of the ezāfe compound.

Hamza is always written on the line in the middle position unless in waw if that letter is preceded by a non-joiner letter; then, it is seated above waw. Hamza is also seated when written above bari yeh. In the final form, Hamza is written in its full form. In ezāfe, hamza is seated above he, yeh or bari yeh of the first word to represent the -e- of ezāfe compound.

 Uyghur alphabet 
In the Uyghur Arabic alphabet, the hamza is not a distinct letter and is not generally used to denote the glottal stop, but rather to indicate vowels. The hamza is only depicted with vowels in their initial or isolated forms, and only then when the vowel starts a word. It is also occasionally used when a word has two vowels in a row.

 Latin representations 
There are different ways to represent hamza in Latin transliteration:

 In the International Phonetic Alphabet (IPA), the sound of the glottal stop is represented by the letter ʔ, resembling a dotless question mark.
 There is a tradition of using , the simple apostrophe; and a grave accent ‹› represents `ayn.
 Some standard transliterations, such as DIN 31635, transliterate it with a modifier letter right half ring ʾ and others such as ALA-LC with the modifier letter apostrophe ʼ and sometimes substituted with the Right Single Quotation Mark ’.
 Different unstandardized symbols exist such as 2'' in Arabic chat alphabet.

See also 

 ʼ and ʾ
 ʻOkina
 Aleph
 Arabic alphabet
 Arabic phonology
 Dagger alif
 Glottal stop (letter)
 Hamza (name)
 Harakat
 Help:IPA/Arabic
 Romanization of Arabic
 Varieties of Arabic

References

External links 
 
 Interactive lesson for learning hamza

Arabic letters
Arabic diacritics
Spelling
Graphemes